The 2007 West Oxfordshire District Council election took place on 3 May 2007 to elect members of West Oxfordshire District Council in Oxfordshire, England. One third of the council was up for election and the Conservative Party stayed in overall control of the council.

After the election, the composition of the council was:
Conservative 36
Liberal Democrats 8
Independent 4
Labour 1

Background
After the 2006 election the Conservatives controlled the council with 34 councillors, while the Liberal Democrats had nine, there were five Independents and Labour had one seat. 16 seats were to be contested in 2007, but on 21 April 2007 the chairman of West Oxfordshire District Council, Conservative Keith Stone, died. As a result, the election in his ward where he had been standing for re-election, Carterton North East, was postponed until 21 June.

For the 15 seats therefore contested on 3 May 2007, the Conservatives had 14 candidates, both the Liberal Democrats and Greens had 11, Labour had five, the UK Independence Party had two and there were two Independents. 11 sitting councillors sought re-election, with these including the only Labour councillor in West Oxfordshire, Eve Coles. There was no contest in Alvescot and Filkins ward, with Conservative David McFarlane being elected without opposition.

Election result
The Conservatives made a net gain of two seats to win 10 of the 15 seats elected on 3 May. This took the Conservatives to 35 seats on the council and a majority of 22. The Conservatives gained three seats in Witney, in Witney Central, Witney East and Witney North wards, to win all five seats contested in the town and meant that only one councillor in Witney was not Conservative, independent Peter Green who had been elected as a Conservative. However the Conservatives lost a seat in Carterton South to the Liberal Democrats by a single vote.

Despite the gain in Carterton South the Liberal Democrats dropped to eight councillors, after losing two seats in Witney and received fewer votes than Labour in Witney. Labour retained their only seat on the council after Eve Cole held Chipping Norton by 163 votes. The number of independent councillors was reduced to four after the election, while overall eight of the 11 councillors who stood again held their seats.
Overall turnout at the election was 38.22%, reaching a high of 51.12% in Charlbury ward.

The Conservatives won a further seat in the delayed election in Carterton North East on 21 June, which was held for the party by Norman Macrae with a majority of 296 votes over independent Paul Wesson.

The above totals include the delayed election in Carterton North East.

Ward results

Carterton North East delayed election

References

2007 English local elections
2007
2000s in Oxfordshire